A dragon turtle  (Lóngguī) is a legendary Chinese creature that combines two of the four celestial animals of Chinese mythology: the body of a turtle with a dragon's head is promoted as a positive ornament in Feng Shui, symbolizing courage, determination, fertility, longevity, power, success, and support.  Decorative carvings or statuettes of the creature are traditionally placed facing the window.

Mapmakers sometimes drew dragon turtles along with other fantastical creatures in unexplored areas.

Dragon turtles appear in some editions of the tabletop roleplaying game Dungeons & Dragons. A dragon turtle appears in the 1983 Dungeons & Dragons cartoon episode, "The Garden of Zinn", its poisonous bite setting up the events of the episode. These creatures have a dragon body and turtle shell, with some types having flippers. Bowser, a primary character in the Super Mario franchise by Nintendo, is based on a dragon turtle.

See also
Bixi - one of the 9 sons of the Dragon King
Chinese mythology in popular culture
Black Tortoise

References

Mythological hybrids
Legendary turtles
Chinese dragons